The 1930 United States Senate election in Montana took place on November 3, 1936. Incumbent United States Senator James E. Murray, who was first elected to the Senate in a special election in 1934, ran for re-election. He narrowly emerged from a competitive and close Democratic primary, wherein he was challenged by United States Congressman Joseph P. Monaghan, who represented Montana's 1st congressional district. In the general election, Murray was opposed by Thomas O. Larson, a State Senator and the Republican nominee, and Monaghan, who, after losing the primary, ran as an independent candidate. Murray ended up winning a second term, and his first full term, in a landslide, defeating both of his opponents by a comfortable margin.

Democratic primary

Candidates
James E. Murray, incumbent United States Senator
Joseph P. Monaghan, United States Congressman from Montana's 1st congressional district
Sam V. Stewart, Montana Supreme Court Associate Justice, former Governor of Montana
Walter B. Sands, Montana Supreme Court Chief Justice

Results

Republican primary

Candidates
Thomas O. Larson, State Senator
L. Ray Carroll, State Senator
Hugh Egan State Representative
Jess H. Stevens, attorney

Results

General election

Results

See also 
 United States Senate elections, 1936

References

Montana
1936
1936 Montana elections